Longford is a barony in County Longford, Republic of Ireland.

Etymology
Longford barony derives its name from the town of Longford (from Irish Longphort Uí Fhearghail, "O'Fergal's riverside camp".

Location

Longford barony is located in northwestern County Longford: east of the River Shannon, north of the River Camlin, south of the Rinn River and Black River, and west of the Longford Hills.

History
Carn Clonhugh was a ritual centre for the Clan Hugh (Clann Aoidh).

List of settlements

Below is a list of settlements in Longford barony:
Ballinamuck
Cloondara
Drumlish
Longford (northern part)
Newtownforbes

References

Baronies of County Longford